Omoglymmius sakuraii is a species of beetle in the subfamily Rhysodidae. It was described by Nakane in 1978.

References

sakuraii
Beetles described in 1978